Sohail Akhtar (born 2 March 1986) is a Pakistani cricketer. He made his first-class debut for Abbottabad in the 2012–13 Quaid-e-Azam Trophy on 25 January 2013. He plays for Lahore Qalandars in the Pakistan Super League and was their captain until he was replaced by Shaheen Afridi for the 2022 season.

Domestic career
Sohail Akhtar made his first-class debut for Abbottabad in the 2012–13 Quaid-e-Azam Trophy on 25 January 2013. He also played for the team in the 2013–14 Quaid-e-Azam Trophy. Sohail Akhtar was named in Lahore Qalandars's squad for the 2018 Pakistan Super League. In April 2018, He was named in Punjab's squad for the 2018 Pakistan Cup. Later, he was named in Northern's squad for 2019–20 National T20 Cup.

Personal life
Akhtar was born in Haripur and speaks Hindko as his native language.

References

External links
 

1986 births
Living people
Hindkowan people
Pakistani cricketers
Abbottabad cricketers
Lahore Qalandars cricketers
Federally Administered Tribal Areas cricketers
People from Haripur District